Bairia is a village in West Champaran district in the Indian state of Bihar.

Demographics
 India census, Bairia had a population of 1479 in 240 households. Males constitute 52.87% of the population and females 47.12%. Bairia has an average literacy rate of 47.87%, lower than the national average of 74%: male literacy is 62.14%, and female literacy is 37.85%. In Bairia, 23.52% of the population is under 6 years of age.

References

Villages in West Champaran district